Nigma hortensis is a spider species found in Portugal, Spain, France and Algeria.

See also 
 List of Dictynidae species

References

External links 

Dictynidae
Spiders of Europe
Spiders of Africa
Fauna of Algeria
Spiders described in 1870